Group A of the 2017 CONCACAF Gold Cup consisted of Honduras, Costa Rica, French Guiana, and Canada. 2017 CONCACAF Gold Cup matches began on July 7 and ended on July 14, 2017.

Teams

Standings

In the quarter-finals:
The winners of Group A, Costa Rica, advanced to play the runners-up of Group B, Panama.
The runners-up of Group A, Canada, advanced to play the runners-up of Group C, Jamaica.
The third-placed team of Group A, Honduras, advanced as one of the two best third-placed teams to play the winners of Group C, Mexico.

Matches

French Guiana vs Canada

Honduras vs Costa Rica

Costa Rica vs Canada

Honduras vs French Guiana

Costa Rica vs French Guiana

Canada vs Honduras

Notes

References

External links
 

Group A